37th may refer to:

37th (Howitzer) Brigade Royal Field Artillery, a brigade of the Royal Field Artillery which served in the First World War
37th (North Hampshire) Regiment of Foot, raised in Ireland in February 1702
37th (Northern Ontario) Battalion, CEF, raised in Halton during World War I
37th Academy Awards honored film achievements of 1964
37th Aerospace Rescue and Recovery Squadron (37th ARRS), a rescue squadron of the USAF active during the Vietnam War
37th Air Army of the High Supreme Command (Strategic Purpose), the strategic bomber force of the Russian Air Force from 1998 to 2009
37th Air Division (37th AD), an inactive United States Air Force organization
37th Airlift Squadron (37 AS), part of the 86th Airlift Wing at Ramstein Air Base, Germany
37th Annie Awards, honoring the best in animation for 2009, held in 2010 at Royce Hall in Los Angeles, California
37th Arkansas Infantry Regiment (1862–1865), a Confederate Army infantry regiment during the American Civil War
37th Armor Regiment (United States) Nicknamed Iron Dukes, the 2nd Battalion was deployed to Operation Iraqi Freedom in 2003
37th Battalion (Australia), an infantry battalion of the Australian Army
37th Battalion Virginia Cavalry, a cavalry battalion raised in Virginia for service in the Confederate States Army during the American Civil War
37th Berlin International Film Festival, held from 20 February to 3 March 1987
37th Bomb Squadron (37 BS), part of the 28th Bomb Wing at Ellsworth Air Force Base, South Dakota
37th British Academy Film Awards, given by the British Academy of Film and Television Arts in 1984, honoured the best films of 1983
37th Canadian Parliament, in session from January 29, 2001, until May 23, 2004
37th century, from January 1, 3601 to December 31, 3700 of the Gregorian calendar
37th century BC in the 4th millennium BC
37th Chess Olympiad, between 20 May and 6 June 2006, in Turin, Italy
37th Daytime Emmy Awards, held on June 27, 2010, hosted by Regis Philbin and broadcast on the CBS network
37th Delaware General Assembly, a meeting of the legislative branch of the state government
37th Division (German Empire), a unit of the Prussian/German Army formed in 1899
37th Division (Imperial Japanese Army), an infantry division in the Imperial Japanese Army
37th Division (United Kingdom), a unit of the British Army during World War I
37th Dogras, an infantry regiment of the British Indian Army
37th Engineer Battalion (United States) ("Eagle Battalion"), an airborne combat engineer battalion in the United States Army
37th Field Artillery Regiment (United States), a Field Artillery regiment of the United States Army
37th Filmfare Awards, held in 1992
37th Flying Training Squadron, part of the 14th Flying Training Wing based at Columbus Air Force Base, Mississippi
37th G8 summit, held 26–27 May 2011 in the commune of Deauville in France
37th General Assembly of Nova Scotia represented Nova Scotia between 1920 and 1925
37th General Assembly of Prince Edward Island, in session from March 7, 1912, to August 21, 1915
37th GMA Dove Awards, held on April 5, 2006, recognizing accomplishments of Christian musicians for the year 2005
37th Golden Globe Awards, honoring the best in film and television for 1979, held on 26 January 1980
37th Grammy Awards, presented March 1, 1995
37th Grey Cup, played on November 26, 1949, before 20,087 fans at Varsity Stadium at Toronto
37th Illinois Volunteer Infantry Regiment, an infantry regiment that served in the Union Army during the American Civil War
37th Indian Infantry Brigade, an Infantry formation of the Indian Army during World War II
37th Infantry Brigade Combat Team (United States)
37th Infantry Division (United States), a unit of the United States Army in World War I and World War II
37th Infantry Regiment (United States), an infantry regiment in the United States Army
37th Iowa Volunteer Infantry Regiment, an infantry regiment that served in the Union Army during the American Civil War
37th Japan Record Awards took place on December 31, 1995, starting at 6:30PM JST
37th Legislative Assembly of Ontario, in session from June 8, 1999, until May 5, 2003, just prior to the Ontario general election
37th Legislative District (New Jersey), one of 40 in the state
37th meridian east, a line of longitude that extends across Europe, Asia, Africa, the Indian Ocean, the Southern Ocean and Antarctica
37th meridian west, a line of longitude that extends across Greenland, the Atlantic Ocean, South America, the Southern Ocean and Antarctica
37th NAACP Image Awards, honored the best in film, television and music for 2005
37th National Assembly of Quebec from 2003 to 2007
37th National Hockey League All-Star Game, held in the Olympic Saddledome in Calgary, Alberta, on February 12, 1985
37th New Brunswick Legislative Assembly represented New Brunswick between February 12, 1931, and May 22, 1935
37th New Jersey Volunteer Infantry Regiment, an infantry regiment in the Union Army during the American Civil War
37th New York State Legislature, met in 1814 during the seventh year of Daniel D. Tompkins's governorship, in Albany
37th Ohio Infantry, a Union Army regiment, composed of German-Americans, in the American Civil War
37th parallel north, a circle of latitude that is 37 degrees north of the Earth's equatorial plane
37th parallel south, a circle of latitude that is 37 degrees south of the Earth's equatorial plane
37th Parliament of British Columbia sat from 2001 to 2005
37th People's Choice Awards, honoring the best in popular culture for 2010, held in 2011 at the Nokia Theatre in Los Angeles, California
37th Primetime Emmy Awards, held on September 22, 1985
37th Regiment Indiana Infantry, an infantry regiment that served in the Union Army during the American Civil War
37th Regiment Kentucky Volunteer Mounted Infantry, a mounted infantry regiment that served in the Union Army during the American Civil War
37th Regiment Massachusetts Volunteer Infantry, an infantry regiment in the Union army during the American Civil War
37th Saturn Awards, honoring the best in science fiction, fantasy and horror film and television in 2010, held on June 23, 2011
37th SS Volunteer Cavalry Division Lützow, formed in February 1945
37th Street (Austin), a street in Austin, Texas, known for its many houses that are decorated with Christmas lights
37th Street (Los Angeles Metro station), a Metro Silver Line Station on the Harbor Transitway on the Interstate 110 (Harbor Freeway)
37th Street (Savannah), a historic divided boulevard in Savannah, Georgia, passing through the Cuyler-Brownsville and Mid-City historic districts
37th Tactical Missile Squadron, an inactive United States Air Force unit
37th Tengen, a Go competition in Japan which began on 7 July 2010 and is still ongoing
37th Tony Awards, held at the Gershwin Theatre on June 5, 1983, and broadcast by CBS television
37th Training Wing, a wing of the United States Air Force stationed at Lackland Air Force Base in San Antonio, Texas
37th United States Congress, a meeting of the legislative branch of the United States federal government
37th Vanier Cup, played on November 25, 2001, at the SkyDome in Toronto, Ontario
37th Virginia Infantry, an infantry regiment raised in Virginia for service in the Confederate States Army during the American Civil War
37th Wisconsin Volunteer Infantry Regiment, an infantry regiment that served in the Union Army during the American Civil War
37th World Science Fiction Convention, Seacon '79, held in Brighton, UK, 23–26 August 1979 at the Metropole Hotel

See also
37 (disambiguation)
37 (number)
AD 37, the year 37 (XXXVII) of the Julian calendar
37 BC
Pope Adrian 37th Psychristiatric, a concept album by the band Rudimentary Peni released in 1995
The 37th Mandala, a horror novel written by Marc Laidlaw and published in 1996
To Gillian on Her 37th Birthday, a 1996 American romantic drama film
To Gillian on Her 37th Birthday (play), an American play by Michael Brady, published in 1984